Something Borrowed - Something Blue is an album by American jazz saxophonist Gerry Mulligan featuring performances recorded in 1966 and first released on the Limelight label.

Reception

AllMusic awarded the album 3 stars with its review by Scott Yanow stating, "This unusual quintet set finds Gerry Mulligan playing alto rather than baritone on four of the six selections. ...swinging music with plenty of fine moments".

Track listing
All compositions by Gerry Mulligan except as indicated
 "Davenport Blues" (Bix Beiderbecke) - 7:29
 "Sometime Ago" (Sergio Mihánovich) - 5:36
 "Take Tea and See" - 7:02
 "Spring Is Sprung" - 6:38
 "New Orleans" (Hoagy Carmichael) - 5:30
 "Decidedly" - 7:34

Personnel
Gerry Mulligan - baritone saxophone (tracks 1 & 2), alto saxophone (tracks 3-6)
Zoot Sims - tenor saxophone
Warren Bernhardt - piano
Eddie Gomez - bass
Dave Bailey - drums

References

Gerry Mulligan albums
1966 albums
Limelight Records albums
Albums produced by Hal Mooney